Ainudrilus geminus is a species of clitellate oligochaete worm, first found in Belize, on the Caribbean side of Central America.

References

Further reading
Erséus, C. "Additional notes on the taxonomy of the marine Oligochaeta of Hong Kong, with a description of a new species of Tubificidae." Marine Flora and Fauna of Hong Kong and Southern China, Hong Kong. Proc. 8th. Int. Mar. Biol. Workshop. Hong Kong Univ. Press. Vol. 1995. 1997.
Hallett, S. L., C. Erséus, and R. J. G. Lester. "Actinosporea from Hong Kong marine oligochaeta." Morton, B eds (1997): 1-7.
Erséus, Christer. "Mangroves and marine oligochaete diversity." Wetlands Ecology and Management 10.3 (2002): 197-202.

External links
WORMS

Tubificina